The Twenty-Third Man is a 1957 mystery detective novel by the British writer Gladys Mitchell. It is the thirtieth in the long-running series of books featuring Mitchell's best known creation, the psychoanalyst and amateur detective Mrs Bradley.

Synopsis
Dame Beatrice Bradley is on holiday in the Canary Islands, staying on a smaller island famous for his cave where the bodies of twenty three mummified ancient kings are buried. However Karl Emden, one of the tourists, on the island appears as a twenty fourth corpse in the cave. Dame Beatrice begins to investigate the passengers who arrived with her, suspecting one of them is the killer.

References

Bibliography
 Magill, Frank Northen. Critical Survey of Mystery and Detective Fiction: Authors, Volume 3. Salem Press, 1988.
 Reilly, John M. Twentieth Century Crime & Mystery Writers. Springer, 2015.

1957 British novels
Novels by Gladys Mitchell
British crime novels
British mystery novels
British thriller novels
Novels set in Spain
British detective novels
Michael Joseph books
Canary Islands in fiction